Alhaji Sir Usman Nagogo dan Muhammadu Dikko  (1905 – 18 March 1981) was Emir of Katsina (Sarkin Katsina) from 19 May 1944, until his death. A Fulani from the Sullubawa Clan, he succeeded his father, Muhammadu Dikko, as Emir, and was succeeded by his son, Muhammadu Kabir Usman.

Education

Nagogo commenced his education under Islamic scholar Attahiru, who taught the future Emir and his brother in Katsina's Gambarawa Quarters. He commenced his elementary education in 1921 at Katsina Provincial School, but was interrupted by his father's visit to England, where the two met King George V of the United Kingdom. He graduated from the provincial school in 1923, after which he taught there for six months.

Political career and reign as Emir

Nagogo was appointed to position of Native Authority Police Chief in 1929; during his term he expanded the police department by erecting new buildings and hiring more officers. In 1937, he became the District Head of Katsina Metropolis.

Nagogo was officially installed as the tenth Emir of Katsina by Arthur Richards, Governor of Northern Nigeria, on May 19, 1944, although he had succeeded his deceased father to the position in March. The same year, he visited England, Egypt, India, and Burma; in Burma, he met with Nigerians in the Royal West African Frontier Force (fighting for the United Kingdom as part of the Chindits).

On January 12, 1946, King George VI of the United Kingdom appointed him as a federal minister of the colony. He was a regional minister without portfolio from 1952 until the military coup of 1966, which one of his sons, Hassan Katsina was involved in.

Life President of the Nigerian Polo Association, Nagogo was one of pioneers of indigenous Nigerian polo; as of 2002, his handicap of +7 is still the highest of any African. He was at one point chairman of Muslim religious organization Jama'atu Nasril Islam (JNI).

Family

Nagogo's mother was Hassatu, from Katsina.

One of Nagogo's sons, Muhammadu Kabir Usman (born January 1928), succeeded his father as Emir upon Nagogo's death, and was Emir as of 2006; Kabir received his name from Arab cleric Sherif Gudid, a friend of Nagogo. Another son, Hassan Katsina (born 1933), joined the Nigerian Army, eventually rising to the position of Major General.

Honours

Nagogo was appointed a Commander of the Order of the British Empire (CBE) in the 1948 New Year Honours, and invested as a Knight Commander of the Order (KBE) in the 1962 New Year Honours. He was appointed a Companion of the Order of St Michael and St George (CMG) in the 1953 Coronation Honours.

References

1905 births
1981 deaths
Emirs of Katsina
Nigerian Muslims
Nigerian recipients of British titles
Nigerian Knights Commander of the Order of the British Empire
Companions of the Order of St Michael and St George
Nigerian polo players
Nigerian traditional rulers